Andrew Thompson is an Australian parasitologist. He is Professor of Parasitology at Murdoch University and a member of the Management Committee of the Australian Society for Parasitology.

References

External links
Parasitology at Murdoch University

Australian parasitologists
Academic staff of Murdoch University
Living people
Year of birth missing (living people)